Konrad Gilewicz (born 4 February 1992) is a Polish former footballer who is last known to have played as a midfielder for Ruch II Chorzów.

Career

In 2010, Gilewicz signed for Austrian top flight side Wacker. In 2012, he signed for Slovak club FC ŠTK 1914 Šamorín. Before the second half of 2012–13, Gilewicz signed for Flota Świnoujście in the Polish second tier, where he made 3 league appearances and scored 0 goals. On 17 March 2013, he debuted for Flota Świnoujście during a 1-2 loss to Polonia Bytom. In 2015, he signed for Polish fourth tier team Ruch II Chorzów.

References

External links

 

Polish expatriate sportspeople in Slovakia
Polish expatriate sportspeople in Austria
Polish expatriate footballers
I liga players
FC ŠTK 1914 Šamorín players
III liga players
Flota Świnoujście players
KS ROW 1964 Rybnik players
Polish footballers
Living people
Expatriate footballers in Slovakia
Association football midfielders
1992 births
Expatriate footballers in Austria
People from Tychy
FC Wacker Innsbruck (2002) players